New York State Route 369 (NY 369) is a state highway located entirely within the town of Fenton in Broome County, New York. It begins at NY 7B south of the concurrency of Interstate 88 and NY 7 in the hamlet of Port Crane and ends at NY 79 in the hamlet of North Fenton.

Route description

NY 369 begins in the Fenton, Broome County hamlet of Port Crane as a northward continuation of NY 7B, which becomes NY 369 upon rounding a curve (the remnants of an intersection between then-NY 7 and NY 369) just southwest of the community. The route heads north into Port Crane, where it intersects half of Interstate 88/NY 7 exit 3 (the ramps leading to and from the eastbound carriageway) at Albany Street. Farther north, access to and from I-88 and NY 7 westbound is made at an intersection just past the overpass carrying I-88 and NY 7 over NY 369.

North of Port Crane, NY 369 follows the eastern bank of the Chenango River for a short distance through rural Fenton before splitting from the waterway south of Chenango Valley State Park, which NY 369 passes to the east. The route ends shortly after passing the park at an intersection with NY 79 just south the Chenango County line in the hamlet of North Fenton.

History
The entirety of modern NY 369 was assigned in the 1930 renumbering. At the time, NY 369 terminated on its southern end at a three-way intersection with NY 7 southwest of Port Crane. When NY 7 was upgraded on the spot to a limited-access highway between Chenango Bridge and Port Crane in the 1970s, the intersection was reconfigured into a curve feeding traffic directly to and from the old surface alignment of NY 7 (now NY 7B).

Major intersections

See also

References

External links

369
Transportation in Broome County, New York